Johann König may refer to:
 Johann König (painter) (1586–1642), German painter
 Johann Friedrich König (1619–1664), German Lutheran theologian
 Johann Balthasar König (1691–1758), German composer
 Johann Samuel König (1712–1757), German mathematician
 Johann Gerhard König (1728–1785), German botanist active in India
 Johann König (gymnast) (born 1932), Austrian gymnast
 Johann König (art dealer) (born 1981), German art dealer

See also 
 Johanna König, German actress
 John Koenig (disambiguation)